Jacques Olivier  (born 13 November 1968 in Pretoria, South Africa) is a former South African rugby union player.

Playing career
Olivier started his career in Pretoria, making his debut for Northern Transvaal in 1990. He played 137 matches for the Northern Transvaal or the Blue Bulls and scored 75 tries, including a record seven tries in a Currie Cup match for Northern Transvaal against South Western Districts during the 1996 season. In 2001, Olivier joined the Pumas and played two seasons for the union.

Olivier made his test debut for the Springboks on 17 October 1992 against France at Stade de Gerland in Lyon. He played 17 tests for the Springboks, scoring three tries and also played a further 17 tour matches in which he scored 10 tries.

Test history

Accolades
Olivier was voted as one of the five Young Players of the Year for 1991, along with Hennie le Roux, Pieter Hendriks, Pieter Muller and Johan Nel.

See also
List of South Africa national rugby union players – Springbok no. 570
List of South Africa national rugby sevens players

References

1968 births
Living people
South African rugby union players
South Africa international rugby union players
Rugby union players from Pretoria
Rugby union wings
Blue Bulls players